Swedification refers to the spread and/or imposition of the Swedish language, people and culture or policies which introduced these changes. In the context of Swedish expansion within Scandinavia, Swedification can refer to both the integration of Scania, Jemtland and Bohuslen in the 1600s and governmental policies regarding Sámi and Finns in northern Sweden during the 1800s and 1900s.

Swedification of Scania
As part of the Treaty of Roskilde at the end of the Second Northern War, all areas in the historical region of Skåneland were ceded by Denmark-Norway to the Swedish Empire in early 1658. For the Swedish Empire, it was important to integrate these new subjects and to make the Scanians feel Swedish, rather than Danish. On 16 April 1658, representatives of Scania, Blekinge and Halland's nobility, citizens, clergy and peasants gathered in Malmö to swear fealty to Charles X Gustav. The king was not present but was represented by an empty chair surrounded by Swedish soldiers.

In 1662, Sweden aligned taxes and regulations in Scania with other parts of Sweden. Some of the new rules were very different from previous Danish practice; for example, the lilla tullen ("the small customs"), which charged a tax for all goods brought into cities. Other changes required each city council to have least two Swedish-born members. At the same time, inhabitants of Scania received representation in the Riksdag, unlike other areas that had been conquered by the Swedish Empire.

When Charles X Gustav landed in Helsingborg in 1658, he met Bishop Peder Winstrup from Lund on the pier, who  became a driving force for the establishment of the University of Lund as a Swedish counterweight to the University of Copenhagen. In 1666, the former was established under the name "Regia Academia Carolina", and its official opening ceremony took place in January 1668.

About two decades after the Treaty of Roskilde, Sweden sought to more fully implement Scania, including enforcing changes to the church and local language. In 1681, local priests aligned with the Church of Sweden and court documents and ecclesiastical correspondence increasingly adopted more standard Swedish grammatical features.

During the Scanian War in the late 1670s, pro-Danish Snapphane fighters aided the Danish invasion. This led to a campaign to capture, torture and execute those who would not swear allegiance to the Swedish king. The policy was effective and by 1709 when Denmark again moved to invade Scania after the Battle of Poltava local militias resisted the effort.

When the Scanian War began in 1675, some 180,000 people lived in Scania. By 1718, only 132,800 were left. Some snapphane fled to Denmark; some 30,000 Scanian boys were sent to the Swedish army, many of whom were relocated to the Baltics. At the same time, Swedes were encouraged to take over Scanian farms and marry Scanian women.

Swedification of Sámi and Finns
Beginning in 1846, Sweden adopted policies designed to define and control its northern region, and to integrate its Sámi and Finnish populations with the Swedish nation. Although censuses began delineating among Sámi, Finns, and Swedes as early as 1805, throughout the 19th and 20th centuries, these definitions changed based on language, occupation, religion, paternal line, and name.

For Sámi, different groups were segregated into reindeer herders, who continued a more nomadic life and were considered less developed, and farmers who were deemed by the government to be Swedes and not Sámi. This  policy forced different schooling on settled children versus nomadic children. By the late 1800s, Swedish became the sole language of instruction in the Torne Valley, which was populated largely by Finnish speakers. In the 1930s, boarding schools were set up for Finns and Sámi children, where they were barred from speaking their native languages and encouraged to adopt "civilized" norms.

These Swedification policies ended in the late 1970s as Sweden officially recognized Sámi as an indigenous people of Sweden. In 2009, the Riksdag passed the Language Law ("Språklag" SFS 2009:600), which recognized Sámi languages and Meänkieli as official minority languages of Sweden, ensuring the right to use these languages in education and administrative proceedings.

In 2020, Sweden funded the establishment of an independent truth commission to examine and document past abuse of Sámi by the Swedish state. A parallel commission to examine past treatment of Tornedalians was also established.

See also
 Sámi school

References

Swedish nationalism
Cultural assimilation
Swedish language
Finland–Sweden relations
Historical linguistics
History of Europe
Political history of Sweden
Swedish Livonia
Swedish Empire
Cultural history of Sweden